Hugh Nanney (c. 1669 – 1701) of Nannau Hall, near Dolgellau, was a Welsh Member of Parliament and Vice-Admiral of North Wales.

He was the 2nd son of Hugh Nanney of Nannau Hall and educated at Eton College and Jesus College, Oxford where he matriculated in 1687. He entered Lincoln's Inn in 1687 to study law. He succeeded his elder brother to the family estate.

He was elected the Member of Parliament for the constituency of Merioneth in the Parliament of 1695.

He was appointed Vice-Admiral of North Wales to serve from 1697 to his death in 1701, and commanded the combined Caernarfonshire and Merionethshire Militia in 1697.

He had married in 1690, Catherine, the daughter of William Vaughan of Cors-y-Gedol, Merionethsire and the widow of Griffith Wynn. They had 4 daughters;  his heiress Janet married Robert Vaughan of Hengwrt, to which family Nannau passed.

References 

1660s births
1701 deaths
People educated at Eton College
Alumni of Jesus College, Oxford
Members of Lincoln's Inn
Members of Parliament for Merioneth
Carnarvon Militia officers
Members of the Parliament of England (pre-1707) for constituencies in Wales
English MPs 1695–1698
English MPs 1698–1700
English MPs 1701–1702
Year of birth uncertain